Cord Jefferson is a television writer, journalist, and essayist who has worked on the TV series Watchmen, Succession, The Good Place, and Master of None. He is the recipient of an Emmy Award, NAACP Image Award, and two Writers Guild of America Awards.

Early life
Cord Jefferson was born in Tucson, Arizona to a white mother and black father. His father is an attorney. After his family lived outside the US for a few years until he was about 5 or 6 years old, he grew up in Tucson. His mother’s father was shocked by her choice to marry a black man and shut her and his grandson out of his life. His parents divorced when he was 14 years old, after he finished his first year of high school.

He attended the College of William & Mary in Virginia, where he was one of a low number of biracial or black people. His father had attended law school there. After college he lived in Los Angeles and in Brooklyn, New York.

His mother died in 2016, of cancer. When his father needed a kidney in 2009, Cord donated one of his kidneys, travelling to Saudi Arabia where his father lives. He wrote a personal essay on this experience. He was treated for atrial fibrillation, after which surgery he stopped smoking and began to take better care of his health.

Career

Journalism 
As a writer, Jefferson got his start in journalism. Among his first jobs were writing for both Stereohyped and MollyGood. He spent several years as an editor at Gawker until Gawker failed financially in 2016. He also wrote for publications including USA Today, Huffington Post, The Root, and The New York Times Magazine.

Television writer 
Jefferson wrote for The Nightly Show with Larry Wilmore and then for Master of None. He and Damon Lindelof won the Emmy for outstanding writing for the sixth episode (This Extraordinary Being) of Watchmen, which aired in November 2019.

In the middle of 2020, Jefferson worked on a TV series about his time writing for Gawker. He is developing the show for Apple TV+. Later in that year, he signed an overall deal with Warner Brothers TV.

Awards and nominations

References

External links 

21st-century American screenwriters
Living people
African-American screenwriters
Year of birth missing (living people)
21st-century African-American writers